Jacques Helbronner (1873-1943) was a French jurist, civil servant and Jewish official. He served as the president of the Israelite Central Consistory of France from 1940 to 1943. He was deported to the Auschwitz concentration camp, where he was murdered in a gas chamber by the Nazis.

Early life
Jacques Helbronner was born on 21 September 1873 in Paris, France. His father, Horace Helbronner, was a lawyer. His mother, Hermance Saint-Paul, was a housewife.

Helbronner graduated from Sciences Po. He received a Doctorate in Law. He did his military service from 1894 to 1895.

Career
Helbronner was a lawyer at the Court of Appeal of Paris from 1895 to 1898. He subsequently worked as a civil servant for the Conseil d'État. He became a Commander of the Legion of Honour in 1925.

Helbronner served as the president of the Israelite Central Consistory of France from 1940 to 1943. He was a supporter of Marshal Philippe Pétain, who told him he had been pressured by the German invaders into passing antisemitic laws. Similarly, Xavier Vallat told Helbronner he would change those laws and spare 95 percent of French Jews. Historian Jacques Adler has argued Helbronner was misled by the Vichy government. Meanwhile, in 1941, Helbronner accepted a leadership position in the Union générale des israélites de France (UGIF, General Organization of Jews in France), even though he was initially opposed to its establishment.

Death
Helbronner was deported to the Auschwitz concentration camp in 1943, where he was murdered in a gas chamber by the Nazis.

See also
 Union générale des israélites de France

References

1873 births
1943 deaths
Lawyers from Paris
19th-century French Jews
Sciences Po alumni
Commandeurs of the Légion d'honneur
French people who died in Auschwitz concentration camp
French Jews who died in the Holocaust